The Black Bossalini (aka Dr. Bomb from da Bay) is the fifth studio album by American rapper Spice 1. It was released on October 28, 1997 via Jive Records. Production was handled by several record producers, including Ant Banks, Paris, Rick Rock, Ali Malek, Clint "Payback" Sands, Femi Ojetunde, Hen-Gee and Mike Mosley. It also features guest appearances from Big Syke, Ice-T, Kokane, Mack 10, MC Breed, Too $hort, WC, and Yukmouth. The album peaked at number 28 on the Billboard 200 chart and at number 5 on the Billboard Top R&B/Hip-Hop Albums chart in the United States.

The album spawned two singles: a promo single "510, 213 / Ballin' / I'm High" and "Playa Man", but none of them made it to Billboard charts. A music video was shot for the song "Playa Man". The song "2 Hands & a Razorblade" was originally heard in the 1997 film Dangerous Ground and was also included on the film's soundtrack.

Critical reception 
Allmusic - "...There are a couple of Southern Californian flourishes here and there...it's a solid record that should appeal to his legions of fans."

Track listing

Sample credits
510 / 213
"That Girl" by Stevie Wonder
Caught Up in My Gunplay
"Anger" by Marvin Gaye
Down Payment on Heaven
"(Pop, Pop, Pop, Pop) Goes My Mind" by LeVert
Playa Man
"Virgin Man" by Smokey Robinson
Recognize Game
"Humpin'" by The Gap Band
The Boss Mobsta
"Friends" by Whodini
The Thug in Me
"Turn Your Love Around" by George Benson

Chart history

References

External links 
[ The Black Bossalini (a.k.a. Dr. Bomb from da Bay)] at Allmusic

The Black Bossalini (aka Dr. Bomb from da Bay) at MusicBrainz

1997 albums
Spice 1 albums
Jive Records albums
Albums produced by Ant Banks
Albums produced by Rick Rock